Alazani Floodplain Forests Natural Monument is a floodplain forest located in Dedoplistsqaro Municipality on the banks of the Alazani River in southeastern Georgia.

Location and access

Flora 
The forest is covered by lianas and also has in abundance perennial walnut, ash, oak and elm, as well as bushes characteristic to floodplain forests. It is the only natural habitat of walnut (Juglans regia) in Georgia.

See also 
 List of natural monuments of Georgia

References

Natural monuments of Georgia (country)
Kakheti